7th Panzer Division may refer to:

 7th Panzer Division (Wehrmacht)
 7th Panzer Division (Bundeswehr)
 7th Panzer Division (East Germany)